Ignacio "Nacho" Vidal Miralles (born 24 January 1995) is a Spanish professional footballer who plays for CA Osasuna as a right-back.

Club career

Valencia
Born in El Campello, Alicante, Valencian Community, Vidal joined Valencia CF's youth academy in 2009 from Hércules CF. He made his debut as a senior with the reserves on 23 March 2014, coming on as a second-half substitute for José Gayà in a 2–0 away loss to Levante UD B in the Segunda División B.

Vidal scored his first senior goal on 14 January 2017, his team's second in the 2–1 home win against RCD Espanyol B. He featured in 42 matches during the season, as his team missed out on promotion in the play-offs. On 4 May, he renewed his contract until 2020.

On 18 August 2017, Vidal made his first-team – and La Liga – debut, starting in a 1–0 home victory over UD Las Palmas. He scored his first goal in the competition on 24 September, helping to beat hosts Real Sociedad 3–2.

Osasuna
On 13 July 2018, Vidal signed a four-year deal with Segunda División club CA Osasuna, with Valencia retaining 50% of his federative rights. He played 38 games in his debut campaign, adding five assists in a return to the top tier as champions.

Career statistics

Club

Honours
Osasuna
Segunda División: 2018–19

References

External links

Ciberche stats and bio 

1995 births
Living people
People from Alacantí
Sportspeople from the Province of Alicante
Spanish footballers
Footballers from the Valencian Community
Association football defenders
La Liga players
Segunda División players
Segunda División B players
Valencia CF Mestalla footballers
Valencia CF players
CA Osasuna players
Spain youth international footballers